Phyllodes are modified petioles or leaf stems, which are leaf-like in appearance and function. In some plants, these  become flattened and widened, while the leaf itself becomes reduced or vanishes altogether. Thus the phyllode comes to serve the purpose of the leaf. Some important examples are Euphorbia royleana which are cylindrical and Opuntia which are flattened.

They are common in the genus Acacia, especially the Australian species, at one time put in Acacia subg. Phyllodineae. Sometimes, especially on younger plants, partially formed phyllodes bearing reduced leaves can be seen. The illustration (to the right) of Acacia suaveolens from Novae Hollandiae plantarum specimen shows the juvenile true leaves, together with the developing phyllodes, and the phyllodes of the mature plant.

The genus, Daviesia, in the family Fabaceae, is characterised in part by the plants having phyllodes.

References

Plant morphology

fr:Phyllode